The Vein (French: La veine) is a 1928 French silent comedy film directed by René Barberis and starring Sandra Milovanoff and Rolla Norman.

Cast
 Sandra Milovanoff as Charlotte Lagnier  
 Rolla Norman as Julien Bréard  
 Paulette Berger as Josephine Doblet  
 André Nicolle as Edmond Tourneur  
 Jules Moy as Chantereau  
 Elmire Vautier as Simone Bauduin  
 Eliane Tayar as La soubrette

References

Bibliography
 Philippe Rège. Encyclopedia of French Film Directors, Volume 1. Scarecrow Press, 2009.

External links
 

1928 films
French silent films
1920s French-language films
Films directed by René Barberis
French comedy films
1928 comedy films
French black-and-white films
1920s French films